Tomahawk Branch is a  long 1st order tributary to the Swannanoa River in Buncombe County, North Carolina.  It has one impoundment at Lake Tomahawk.

Course
Tomahawk Branch rises about 1.5 miles north of Black Mountain, North Carolina in Buncombe County on the North Fork Swannanoa River divide.  Tomahawk Branch then flows south to meet the Swannanoa River at Black Mountain, North Carolina.

Watershed
Tomahawk Branch drains  of area, receives about 47.6 in/year of precipitation, has a topographic wetness index of 326.37 and is about 36% forested.

References

Rivers of North Carolina
Bodies of water of Buncombe County, North Carolina